Giuseppe Sabadini (born 26 March 1949) is an Italian football coach and former player, who played as a defender.

Club career
Sabadini played 18 seasons (393 games, 17 goals) in the Serie A for U.C. Sampdoria, A.C. Milan, F.C. Catanzaro, Calcio Catania and Ascoli Calcio 1898.

International career
At international level, Sabadini earned four caps for the Italy national team, and was included in the Italian squad for the 1974 FIFA World Cup. He did not feature in any matches at the tournament.

Honours
Milan
 Coppa Italia: 1971–72, 1972–73, 1976–77
 UEFA Cup Winners' Cup: 1972–73

References

External links
 

Living people
1949 births
Italian footballers
Association football midfielders
Italy international footballers
1974 FIFA World Cup players
Serie A players
U.C. Sampdoria players
A.C. Milan players
U.S. Catanzaro 1929 players
Catania S.S.D. players
Ascoli Calcio 1898 F.C. players
Italian football managers
U.S. Catanzaro 1929 managers
Venezia F.C. managers
U.S. Alessandria Calcio 1912 managers
A.C.R. Messina managers
U.S. Castrovillari Calcio managers
Taranto F.C. 1927 managers